Corrective Measures is a 2022 American superhero film written, produced and directed by Sean O'Reilly and starring Bruce Willis and Michael Rooker. It is based on the graphic novel of the same name by Grant Chastain. It is also O'Reilly's debut in a live-action feature film.

Corrective Measures was released by Tubi in select theaters and VOD on April 29, 2022.

Plot
Psychopathic villain "Payback" finds himself incarcerated in the world's most secure prison - a facility designed to house super-villains and overseen by the corrupt Warden Devlin.

Cast
Bruce Willis as Julius "The Lobe" Loeb
Michael Rooker as Overseer Warden Devlin
Dan Payne as Payback
Brennan Mejia as Diego Diaz
Tom Cavanagh as Gordon Tweedy
Kat Ruston as Officer Liz Morales
Kevin Zegers as Captain Jason Brody
Hayley Sales as Dr. Isabelle Josephs
Daniel Cudmore as Diamond Jim

Production
By September 2021, Bruce Willis, Michael Rooker, Dan Payne, Brennan Mejia, Tom Cavanagh, Kat Ruston, Kevin Zegers, Hayley Sales, and Daniel Cudmore were set to star in the film. Sean O'Reilly served as the film's director, writer, and producer.

Release
The film debuted on April 29, 2022 on Tubi. Corrective Measures is one of the last films to star Willis, who retired from acting because he was diagnosed with frontotemporal dementia.

Box office
As of August 27, 2022, Corrective Measures grossed $17,750 in the United Arab Emirates.

Critical response

References

External links
 

American independent films
Tubi original programming
2022 action thriller films
2022 independent films
2022 science fiction films
2020s English-language films
2020s superhero films
Films based on American comics
Live-action films based on comics
Supervillain films
2020s American films